George Nelson may refer to:

George Nelson (Lord Mayor of London), Lord Mayor of London, 1765
George Nelson, 8th Earl Nelson (1905–1981)
George Nelson (astronaut) (born 1950), former NASA astronaut
George Nelson (designer) (1908–1986), American
George Nelson (footballer) (1919–1981), Australian footballer for Collingwood and Richmond
George Nelson (trade unionist) (1868-1928), British trade unionist and politician
George Nelson, 1st Baron Nelson of Stafford (1887–1962), British engineer
George A. Nelson (1873–1962), 1936 vice presidential candidate of the Socialist Party of America
George B. Nelson (1876–1943), justice of the Wisconsin Supreme Court
George R. Nelson (1927–1992), American set decorator
George Nelson (Alamo defender)

See also 
Baby Face Nelson (1908–1934), bank robber, also known as George Nelson
George Neilson, Scottish rugby player
Nelson George (born 1957), African-American author, critic and filmmaker